The Oxford Down is a British breed of domestic sheep. It was developed in the 1830s by cross-breeding of Hampshire Down and Southdown ewes with Cotswold rams. It is reared primarily for meat.

History 

The Oxford Down developed from about 1830, when Hampshire Down and Southdown ewes were put to Cotswold rams. Much of this breeding took place in the area of Witney in western Oxfordshire, and this gave rise to the breed name. A breed society, the Oxford Down Sheep Breeders Association, was formed in 1889 and a flock-book was published in the same year.

In the twenty-first century it is an endangered breed in the United Kingdom, and is listed as 'at risk' on the watchlist of the Rare Breeds Survival Trust. A population of just over  head was reported to DAD-IS in 2021. Outside the UK, it is distributed ten other European countries and in Canada and the United States; the global population is estimated to be some  head, and its international conservation status is 'not at risk'.

Characteristics 

The Oxford Down is a very large sheep, the largest of the Down breeds, robust and powerful. It is a shortwool breed, white on the body with brown or black wool on the face and lower legs. It produces the heaviest fleece of any of the Down breeds. Its capacity to produce a large, meaty carcase for further processing has stimulated interest from the meat industry, and it also grows the most wool of any of the terminal sire breeds.

References

External links
Oxford Down Sheep Breeders' Association UK official website
1904 St. Louis World's Fair Oxford Show

Sheep breeds
History of Oxfordshire
Culture in Oxford
Sheep breeds originating in England
Animal breeds on the RBST Watchlist